Namah (Persian for "reflection on" or Sanskrit for "salution to" ) may refer to :

Faramarz Namah, a Persian epic recounting the adventures of the hero Faramarz 
Sindbad Namah, a Persian epic recounting the adventures of the hero Sindbad
Shah Namah, a Persian epic recounting the adventures of the King
Namah (TV series), 2019 Indian television series
Namah (Peter Machajdík album), 2008
Namah (Thaikkudam Bridge album), 2019
"Namah", a song by David S. Ware from Shakti (2008)

See also
 Nama (disambiguation)
 Om Namah Shivaya (disambiguation)